Balchen may refer to:

Surname 
 Bernt Balchen (1899–1973), a pioneer polar aviator, navigator, aircraft mechanical engineer and military leader
 Fredrik Glad Balchen (1815–1899), a Norwegian deaf teacher
 Jens Glad Balchen (1926–2009), a Norwegian engineer
 John Balchen (1670–1744), an Admiral of the British Royal Navy

Toponym 

 Balchen Glacier in Antarctica
 Balchen Mountain in Antarctica (72°0′S, 27°12′E)
 Mount Balchen, a mountain in Antarctica (85°22′S, 166°12′W)